The Strike is a 1914 Swedish silent drama film directed by Victor Sjöström.

Cast
 Victor Sjöström as Karl Bernsson / Gustav Bernsson
 Lilly Jacobson as Gurli Hagberg
 John Ekman as Boberg
 Carl Borin
 Ernst Eklund
 Alfred Lundberg as Charles Hagberg
 Richard Lund

References

External links

1914 films
1910s Swedish-language films
Swedish black-and-white films
1914 drama films
Swedish silent films
Films directed by Victor Sjöström
Swedish drama films
Silent drama films